Dadaş İbrahimov (born 4 July 1976) is an Azerbaijani sprinter. He competed in the men's 200 metres at the 2004 Summer Olympics.

References

1976 births
Living people
Athletes (track and field) at the 2004 Summer Olympics
Azerbaijani male sprinters
Olympic athletes of Azerbaijan
Place of birth missing (living people)